East Kimberley was an electoral district of the Legislative Assembly in the Australian state of Western Australia from 1890 to 1904.

Based in the eastern part of the Kimberley region, the district was one of the original 30 seats contested at the 1890 election. In 1898, its major settlements were Wyndham and Halls Creek; it included the Kimberley Goldfield which had seen a gold rush a few years earlier. It ceased to exist at the 1904 election, at which point it was amalgamated with the district of West Kimberley to form the new district of Kimberley.

Members

Election results

References

East Kimberley
1890 establishments in Australia
Constituencies established in 1890
1901 disestablishments in Australia
Constituencies disestablished in 1901
Electoral district